College Park is a city in Prince George's County, Maryland, United States, and is approximately four miles (6.4 km) from the northeast border of Washington, D.C. The population was 34,740 at the 2020 United States census. College Park is best known as the home of the University of Maryland, College Park. 

Since 1994, the city has also been home to the National Archives at College Park, a facility of the U.S. National Archives, the National Oceanic and Atmospheric Administration (NOAA) Center for Weather and Climate Prediction (NCWCP), and the Food and Drug Administration's Center for Food Safety and Applied Nutrition (CFSAN).

History

19th century
College Park was developed beginning in 1889 near the Maryland Agricultural College (later the University of Maryland) and the College Station stop of the Baltimore and Ohio Railroad. The suburb was incorporated in 1945 and included the subdivisions of College Park, Lakeland, Berwyn, Oak Spring, Branchville, Daniel's Park, and Hollywood.

The original College Park subdivision was first platted in 1872 by Eugene Campbell. The area remained undeveloped and was re-platted in 1889 by John O. Johnson and Samuel Curriden, Washington real estate developers. College Park developed rapidly, catering to those who were seeking to escape the crowded Washington, D.C., as well as to a rapidly expanding staff of college faculty and employees.

College Park originally included single-family residences constructed in the Shingle, Queen Anne, and Stick styles, as well as modest vernacular dwellings. Commercial development increased in the 1920s, aided by the increased automobile traffic and the growing campus along Baltimore Avenue/Route 1.

20th century
By the late 1930s, most of the original subdivision had been partially developed. Several fraternities and sororities from the University of Maryland built houses in the neighborhood. After World War II, construction consisted mostly of infill of ranch and split-level houses. After incorporation in 1945, the city continued to grow, and a municipal center was built in 1959.

The Lakeland neighborhood was developed beginning in 1890 around the Baltimore and Ohio Railroad, whose Branchville and Calvert Road depots were located approximately one mile to the north and south, respectively. Lakeland was created by Edwin Newman, who improved the original  located to the west of the railroad. He also built a number of the original homes, a small town hall, and a general store. The area was originally envisioned as a resort-type community. However, due to the flood-prone, low-lying topography, the neighborhood became an area of African-American settlement. Around 1900, the Baltimore Gold Fish Company built five artificial lakes in the area to spawn goldfish and rarer species of fish. By 1903 Lakeland was an established African-American community with a school and two churches. Lakeland was central in a group of African American communities located along Route One through Prince Georges County. Lakeland High School opened in 1928 with funding from the Rosenwald Fund, the African American community and the county. Lakeland High served all African American students in the northern half of the county until 1950 when it was converted to a facility for lower grades. The community's first Rosenwald school was a new elementary which opened in 1925.

The Berwyn neighborhood was developed beginning about 1885 adjacent to the Baltimore and Ohio Railroad. It was created by Francis Shannabrook, a Pennsylvanian who purchased a tract of land between Baltimore Avenue and the railroad tracks. Shannabrook established a small depot, built a general store, and erected approximately 15 homes in the area to attract moderate-income families looking to move out of Washington. The neighborhood began to grow after 1900 when the City and Suburban Electric Railway entered the area. By 1925, approximately 100 single-family homes existed, mostly two-story, wood-frame buildings. The community housing continued to develop in the 1930s and 1940s with one story bungalows, Cape Cods, and Victorians and, later, raised ranches and split-level homes.

The Daniels Park neighborhood was developed, beginning in 1905 on the east and west sides of the City and Suburban Electric Railway in north College Park. This small residential subdivision was improved with single-family houses arranged along a grid pattern of streets. The houses—built between 1905 and the 1930s—range in style from American Foursquares to bungalows.

The Hollywood neighborhood was developed in the early 20th century along the City and Suburban Electric Railway. Edward Daniels, the developer of Daniels Park, planned the Hollywood subdivision as a northern extension of that earlier community. Development in Hollywood was slow until after World War II, when Albert Turner acquired large tracts of the northern part of the neighborhood in the late 1940s. Turner was able to develop and market brick and frame three-bedroom bungalows beginning in 1950. By 1952, an elementary school had been built. Hollywood Neighborhood Park, a  facility along the Baltimore and Ohio Railroad line, is operated by the Maryland-National Capital Park and Planning Commission.

In 1943, due to World War II efforts to conserve rail transport, the Washington Senators relocated their spring training camp to College Park. The locations of 1943 Major League Baseball spring training camps were limited to an area east of the Mississippi River and north of the Ohio River.

During the 1960s through the 1980s an Urban Renewal Project took place within the historic African American community of Lakeland. This project was carried out in the face of the opposition of the community's residents and resulted in the redevelopment of approximately two thirds of the community. It displaced 104 of Lakeland's 150 households.

21st century

On September 24, 2001, a multiple-vortex F3 tornado hit the area. This storm moved at peak intensity through the University of Maryland College Park campus, and then moved north parallel to I-95 to the Laurel area, where F3 damage was also noted. The tornado caused two deaths and 55 injuries and $101 million in property damage. The two deaths were sisters who died when their car was picked up and hurled over a building before being slammed to the ground. Both young women were University of Maryland students. This tornado was part of the Maryland, Virginia, and Washington, D.C., tornado outbreak of 2001, one of the most dramatic recent tornado events to directly affect the Baltimore-Washington metropolitan area.

By the turn of the 21st century, College Park began experiencing significant development pressure. Both students and city residents acknowledged the city's lack of amenities and poor sense of place. In 2002, the city and county passed the Route 1 Sector Plan, which allowed and encouraged mixed use development along College Park's main roadway. Recent projects—like the East Campus Redevelopment Initiative, The University View, The Varsity, and Landmark student apartments and the Northgate Condos—give many in the community hope that the city, like other notable American college towns, might one day have a vibrant downtown and a diverse population. In 2004, College Park annexed  that were previously considered to be in Beltsville, an unincorporated area; this tract included a Holiday Inn and an IKEA.

The University of Maryland's Student Government Association sponsored a design charrette in April 2006 to envision the future of College Park. In July 2006, a group of students created Rethink College Park—a community group providing a website to share information about development and to encourage public dialogue.

Since 2009, other notable architectural additions to College Park have been: a parking garage (with The Ledo Restaurant on ground level) in downtown near the intersection of Route 1 and Knox Road; The University View and The Varsity student apartment towers with ground floor retail businesses; graduate school apartment towers adjacent to The View apartments; and The Hotel at the University of Maryland.

As of 2020, the University of Maryland is undergoing many major construction projects on campus. Construction includes a $13.7 million addition of four new wings to the chemistry building, a $195.7 million sports and medicine complex for Cole Field House, a new public policy school building at about $52.4 million between the Lee Building and Rossborough Inn, a $60 million IDEA (Innovate, Design and Engineer for America) Factory, and a $14.5 million replacement of all mechanical equipment in wing 2 of the H.J. Patterson Hall.

On June 9, 2020, the city government passed a "Resolution of the Mayor and Council of the City of College Park Renouncing Systemic Racism and Declaring Support of Black Lives" which recognized harm done to the historic African American community of Lakeland. In it, "the Mayor and Council acknowledge and apologize for our city's past history of oppression, particularly with regards to the Lakeland community, and actively seek opportunities for accountability and truth-telling about past injustice, and aggressively seek opportunities for restorative justice".

On March 2, 2023, College Park Mayor Patrick Wojahn, who had served as Mayor since 2015, resigned after being arrested on child pornography charges involving 40 counts of possession of child exploitative material and 16 counts of distribution of child exploitative material.

Demographics

The median income for a household in the city was $50,168, and the median income for a family was $62,759 (these figures had risen to $66,953 and $82,295 respectively as of a 2007 estimate). Males had a median income of $40,445 versus $31,631 for females. The per capita income for the city was $16,026. About 4.2% of families and 19.9% of the population were below the poverty line, including 6.9% of those under age 18 and 9.2% of those age 65 or over.

2010 census
As of the census of 2010, there were 30,413 people, 6,757 households, and 2,852 families residing in the city. The racial makeup of the city was 63.0% White, 14.3% African American, 0.3% Native American, 12.7% Asian, 0.1% Pacific Islander, 6.0% from other races, and 3.5% from two or more races. Hispanic or Latino residents of any race were 11.9% of the population.

There were 6,757 households, of which 18.4% had children under the age of 18 living with them, 30.6% were married couples living together, 7.9% had a female householder with no husband present, 3.7% had a male householder with no wife present, and 57.8% were non-families. 24.8% of all households were made up of individuals, and 6.6% had someone living alone who was 65 years of age or older. The average household size was 2.79 and the average family size was 3.18.

The median age in the city was 21.3 years. 7.6% of residents were under the age of 18; 60.7% were between the ages of 18 and 24; 15.7% were from 25 to 44; 11% were from 45 to 64; and 5.1% were 65 years of age or older. The gender makeup of the city was 53.1% male and 46.9% female.

2000 census
As of the census of 2000, there were 24,657 people, 6,030 households, and 3,039 families residing in the city. The racial makeup of the city was 68.82% White, 15.93% Black or African American, 0.33% Native American, 10.03% Asian, 0.01% Pacific Islander, 2.57% from other races, and 2.31% from two or more races. 5.54% of the population were Hispanic or Latino of any race.

There were 6,030 households, out of which 19.8% had children under the age of 18 living with them, 38.6% were married couples living together, 8.3% had a female householder with no husband present, and 49.6% were non-families. 25.7% of all households were made up of individuals, and 9.1% had someone living alone who was 65 years of age or older. The average household size was 2.65 and the average family size was 3.11.

In the city, 10.5% of the population was under the age of 18, 51.3% was between from 18 to 24, 19.8% from 25 to 44, 11.3% from 45 to 64, and 7.2% were 65 years of age or older. The median age was 22 years. For every 100 females, there were 110.3 males. For every 100 females age 18 and over, there were 111.2 males.

Government
College Park has a Council–Manager form of government. The city manager is appointed by the city council and the mayor elected every two years. The council has eight members, representing four districts in the city. City Council meetings are held weekly at the College Park City Hall.

The position of Mayor of College Park is currently vacant, although Denise Mitchell, who took office following the resignation of Patrick J. Wojahn on March 2, 2023, is the Mayor pro tem. 

Previous mayors were:

College Park has six government departments:

Prince George's County Police Department District 1 Station in Hyattsville serves College Park.

The U.S. Postal Service operates the College Park Post Office and the North College Park Post Office.

, College Park belongs to Maryland's 4th congressional district.

Geography
College Park is located at  (38.996560, -76.927509).

Climate
The climate in this area is characterized by hot, humid summers and generally mild to cool winters. According to the Köppen climate classification system, College Park has a humid subtropical climate, abbreviated "Cfa" on climate maps.

Neighborhoods

Autoville/Cherry Hill
Berwyn
Branchville
Calvert Hills
College Park Woods
Crystal Springs/Patricia Court
Daniels Park
Hollywood
Lakeland
North College Park
Old Town
Sunnyside
Yarrow

Adjacent areas
Beltsville (North)
Berwyn Heights (East)
University Park (Southwest)
Riverdale Park (South)
Adelphi (West)
Hyattsville (Southwest)

Economy
According to the city's 2017 Comprehensive Annual Financial Report, the top employers in the city are:

Transportation

Roads and highways
The most prominent highway serving College Park is Interstate 95/Interstate 495, the Capital Beltway. I-495 encircles Washington, D.C. via the Capital Beltway, providing access to the city and its many suburbs. I-95 only follows the eastern portion of the beltway, diverging away from the beltway near its northeasternmost and southwesternmost points. To the north, I-95 passes through Baltimore, Philadelphia, New York City and Boston on its way to Canada, while to the south, it traverses Richmond on its way to Florida.

Primary access to College Park from I-95/I-495 is provided via an interchange with U.S. Route 1, which traverses downtown College Park along Baltimore Avenue. Maryland State Route 193 also passes through the city, following University Boulevard and Greenbelt Road from west to east. MD 431 also serves College Park, linking it with Riverdale Park.

Airport
College Park Airport is the oldest continuously operating airport in the United States and is one of the oldest airports in the world, having been in continuous operation since 1909. It originated as the site where the U.S. government began to train pilots, under the tutelage of Wilbur Wright, for military purposes. Its future status is uncertain, as it lies just a few miles outside the restricted airspace of Washington, D.C. In 1977, the airport was added to the National Register of Historic Places.

Area commercial airports include Baltimore-Washington International Airport, Reagan National Airport, and Washington Dulles International Airport.

Public transportation

College Park–University of Maryland Station on the Washington Metro's Green Line is in College Park; a large commuter parking garage was completed in 2004 adjacent to the Metro station. MARC trains run on CSX tracks adjacent to the Green Line and stop at a small station next to the College Park Metro station. The Metro station lies at what had been the historic junction of Calvert Road and the CSX tracks.

College Park had streetcar service from 1903 to 1962 along what is now Rhode Island Avenue and the College Park Trolley Trail.

College Park will also have three Purple Line light rail stations when the system opens in 2026. These will be the Campus Center station, East Campus station, and a station connected to the existing College Park-University of Maryland Metro station. The Purple Line will link the Metro's Red, Green, Yellow, and Orange lines. As well as the MARC commuter rail's Penn and Camden lines. The Purple Line station on the University of Maryland campus will eliminate the need for a bus route to the university's main Metro station, the Green line's College Park – U of Md station.

Historic sites
The following is a list of historic sites in College Park identified by the Maryland-National Capital Park and Planning Commission. Part of the city is located within the Calvert Hills Historic District; listed on the National Register of Historic Places in 2002.

Media

UMTV (University of Maryland)
WMUC broadcasts from the University of Maryland campus, with a range of two miles (3 km) – roughly from the campus to the Beltway. It is also broadcast over the internet at www.wmucradio.com.
The Diamondback, a student publication, formerly distributed once a week on a limited basis downtown, including in city hall, and widely on the campus of the University of Maryland. Print editions were discontinued in March 2020, and the newspaper was moved entirely online.
College Park: Here & Now, which began publishing in 2020, is a free monthly nonprofit newspaper available throughout the city.
The oldest operational Persian podcast is called Radio College Park as it is produced by a group of Iranian graduate students at the University of Maryland, College Park.

The city is part of the Washington, D.C. television market (DMA #9).

Education

Colleges and universities
The University of Maryland, College Park, the flagship institution of the University System of Maryland, is located within the College Park city limits.

Primary and secondary schools

Public schools
College Park is served by Prince George's County Public Schools. The city is zoned to several different schools.

Elementary school students are zoned to:
Hollywood Elementary School (in College Park)
Paint Branch Elementary School (in College Park)
Berwyn Heights Elementary School (in Berwyn Heights)
University Park Elementary School (in University Park)
Cherokee Lane Elementary School (Adelphi CDP)

Middle school students are zoned to:
Greenbelt Middle School (in Greenbelt)
Hyattsville Middle School (in Hyattsville)
Buck Lodge Middle School (Adelphi CDP)

High school students are zoned to:
High Point High School (Beltsville CDP)
Northwestern High School (Hyattsville)
Parkdale High School (Riverdale Park)

Other area public high schools include: Eleanor Roosevelt High School (Greenbelt).

PGCPS previously operated College Park Elementary School. For a period Friends Community School occupied the building, but it moved out in 2007. The nascent College Park Academy attempted to lease the previous College Park elementary building, but there was community opposition. The grade 6-12 charter school currently is located in Riverdale Park.

Prior to the Civil Rights Movement of the mid-20th Century, white and black students attended schools that were racially segregated by law. Lakeland Elementary School, a school for black children, opened in 1925, and after Lakeland and other area communities asked for a high school for black students, Lakeland High School opened in 1928. The latter became one of two senior high schools in Prince George's County for black people, the other being Frederick Douglass High School, then in Upper Marlboro. Lakeland High and Elementary were financed by the Rosenwald Fund and therefore were Rosenwald Schools. In 1950, Lakeland High was replaced by Fairmont Heights High School near Fairmount Heights. In turn, Lakeland Elementary School moved into the former high school building. Circa 1964, legal racial segregation ended in Prince George's County schools.

Private schools
Private schools include:
Dar-us-Salaam/Al Huda School, K–12 (College Park)
Berwyn Baptist School, PreK–8
Friends Community School, K–8
Holy Redeemer School, PreK–8
Laurel Springs School at Junior Tennis Champions Center, K–12
Saint Francis International School St. Mark Campus, K–8, Hyattsville – formerly St. Mark the Evangelist School, closed and merged into Saint Francis International, which opened in 2010.

Museums
The Art Gallery at the University of Maryland
College Park Aviation Museum
National Museum of Language

City-student politics
Like many college towns, College Park has had its share of political controversy. Occasionally, University of Maryland students plan voter registration drives and seek to elect one of their own to the city council. City residents, including students living within the city are eligible to run for city council if they are at least 18 years of age. Several attempts at student representation across two decades were unsuccessful until Marcus Afzali won a seat in 2009.

 1993 – Dana L. Loewenstein & Michael J. Moore – Perhaps the most controversial of all student races was that of Loewenstein, a former president of the Panhellenic Association, the sorority umbrella organization at the university. A year after she had lost the election, she was charged with 16 counts of perjury, 16 counts of aiding and advising to falsely register voters and faced a maximum prison sentence of over 200+ years. Ms. Loewenstein's opponent in the council race, Michael Smith, joined former council member Chester Joy in filing a complaint with the Prince George's County Board of Elections days before the Nov 2 election in an effort to intimidate students from voting. The complaint alleged that 16 of her sorority pledges lived in one district but registered in another. The complaint was turned over to the state's attorney, who filed criminal charges against Loewenstein a year after she lost the election, despite no student voting illegally. The complaint alleged that all of the pledges lived in on-campus dorms but used the house address as their residence. Loewenstein was found not guilty by the Circuit Court.
2001 – Mike Mann & Daniel Dorfman – In November 2001, Michael Mann and Daniel Dorfman, sought the two District 3 seats on the College Park City Council. Campaigning against incumbent Eric Olson and for an open seat created by then-councilman Brayman's decision to run for mayor, the two campaigned heavily to inform students there was a council race going on that year, and registered over 700 students to vote in the municipal election. Despite their hard work and an almost year-long campaign, they were defeated.
2007 – Nick Aragon – In January 2007, Nick Aragon lost a special election for the city council. Two incumbents created a vacancy when they were elected to higher county offices. In turn, the city was forced to hold a special election after the November 2006 elections. The city chose an election date during the university's winter recess, a time when many students were away from the city. With some help from the Student Government Association (SGA) and an endorsement by College Park Mayor Steve Brayman, the Aragon campaign encouraged students to use absentee ballots, although few actually did, and Aragon lost the election.
2009 – Marcus Afzali – A 24-year-old doctoral student in the Department of Government and Politics at UMD, Afzahli won a seat on the city council representing District 4 in November 2009. He attributed displays of "energy"—exemplified by taking time to knock on doors and reach out to residents—as the cause behind his success. The 2009 election is notable not only for Afzali's performance at the polls, but for the fact that both District 4 incumbents lost.

References

Further reading
 "Langley Park-College Park-Greenbelt Approved Master Plan (October 1989) and Adopted Sectional Map Amendment." Maryland-National Capital Park and Planning Commission, May 1990. Read online.
 "The Approved College Park-Riverdale Park Transit District Development Plan." Maryland-National Capital Park and Planning Commission, March 2015. Read online. 
A Guide to the City of College Park, from the College Park City Hall.
 
 A History of the Lakeland Community of College Park (video presentation). Corridor Conversations, February 2022.

External links

 
 
 Route 1 Communities: College Park

 
1856 establishments in Maryland
Cities in Maryland
Cities in Prince George's County, Maryland
Cities in the Baltimore–Washington metropolitan area
Populated places established in 1856
Washington metropolitan area